Mehrzad Madanchi Ardekani (born 12 October 1983) is an Iranian former football midfielder who last played for Fajr Sepasi.

Club career
The attacker started his playing career in Homa Shiraz club which plays in the lower Iranian divisions. After playing impressively at the lower division Shiraz club, he earned a transfer to Fajr Sepasi, one of the top two clubs of Shiraz (the other being Bargh Shiraz). He was immediately seen as a big talent and continued to play well in the 2004/2005 season. The speedy left winger saw his performances be rewarded with a transfer to the most popular club in Iran, Persepolis, in July 2005.

In the 2005/2006 season at Persepolis Madanchi grew to become a first team player. He played some good matches on the left wing during the season, due to his great speed and dribbling. His main problem however was his crossing ability, which many agreed could be greatly improved. At the end of the season Persepolis coach Arie Haan took Madanchi away from the left wing and put him in as a striker, with topscorer Javad Kazemian as his partner. This position worked immediately, as in three matches in the Hazfi Cup Madanchi scored seven goals, a hattrick against Abu Muslem and two doubles against Malavan and Nojan.

In the 2006/2007 season at Persepolis Madanchi was put in the striker position by head coach Mustafa Denizli. This really helped out Persepolis because Madanchi was able to score 10 goals and make 5 assists in the League and was announced the best player of the 2006/2007 IPL season called the Persian Gulf Cup. On 10 July 2007 Madanchi signed a one-year deal with U.A.E's club Al-Shaab for a fee of $500,000.

During the 2007/2008 season at Al-Shaab, Madanchi played in the Striker position for the entire season which resulted in him scoring 17 goals in three different competitions. He scored 14 goals in the UAE League, while scoring two goals in the Arab Champions League and one goal in the UAE Cup. Although, 8 of his 17 goals were scored from the penalty spot. After the season Madanchi was named the Foreign Player of the Season 2007/08 of the UAE League.

On 31 May 2008 Madanchi signed a one-year deal with Al-Nasr Sports Club in the UAE League in a contract is thought to be worth over $1.5 million. He moved to Al-Ahli in summer 2009 where he played in CWC and also AFC Champions League.

He joined Steel Azin in 2010 and stayed there for a season where he had an unsuccessful season because of the injuries he had and after the relegation of the team he moved to Al Shaab but again because of the injuries he had his contract was canceled halfway through the season.

On 16 July 2012 he joined Persepolis with a three-year contract. After spending one season at the club and not gaining much of playing time, his contract was terminated and he joined Fajr Sepasi.

Club career statistics

 Assist Goals

International career
Madanchi was selected for the Iranian Olympic team during the qualifiers for the Olympic Games 2004. Although Iran failed to qualify for the tournament, Madanchi, at the time only 18, was one of the stars of the young team. His good performance during the qualifiers led to him being called up to the full national team and he made his debut in August 2003 against Belarus. His most impressive international match was Iran's Asian Cup qualifier against Chinese Taipei in March 2006, in which he scored two of Iran's four goals. He also scored one goal against Bosnia in a World Cup warmup friendly.

He was selected for Iran's final World Cup 2006 squad as one of the 23 players. In July 2007 and for the Asian Championships Madanchi was called for Team Melli once again. He has been called up for Team Melli for the 2010 FIFA World Cup Qualifying. He also featured and scored in 2011 AFC Asian Cup qualification.

International goals 
Scores and results list Iran's goal tally first.

International Matches
 Belarus, 20 August 2003, friendly match
 Panama, 18 December 2004, friendly match
 Taiwan, 22 February 2006, 2007 Asian Cup qualifiers
 Costa Rica, 1 March 2006, friendly match
 Croatia, 28 May 2006, friendly match
 Bosnia, 31 May 2006, friendly match
 Mexico, 11 June 2006, 2006 Fifa World Cup
 Portugal, 17 June 2006, 2006 Fifa World Cup
 Angola, 21 June 2006, 2006 Fifa World Cup
 United Arab Emirates, 8 August 2006, friendly match
 Syria, 16 August 2006, 2007 Asian Cup qualifiers
 South Korea, 2 September 2006, 2007 Asian Cup qualifiers
 Syria, 6 September 2006, 2007 Asian Cup qualifiers
 Iraq, 4 October 2006, friendly match
 Qatar, 24 March 2007, friendly match
 Ghana, 28 June 2007, friendly match
 Jamaica, 2 July 2007, friendly match
 Uzbekistan, 11 July 2007, Asian Cup
 China, 15 July 2007, Asian Cup
 Korea Republic, 22 July 2007, Asian Cup
 Qatar, 10 January 2008, friendly match
 Costa Rica, 30 January 2008, friendly match
 Syria, 6 February 2008, World Cup Qualifiers
 Bahrain, 22 March 2008, friendly match
 Kuwait, 26 March 2008, World Cup Qualifiers
 Azerbaijan, 27 August 2008, friendly match
 Saudi Arabia, 6 September 2008, World Cup Qualifiers
 United Arab Emirates, 19 November 2008, World Cup Qualifiers
 Saudi Arabia, 28 March 2009, World Cup Qualifiers
 Senegal, 1 April 2009, friendly match
 China, 1 June 2009, friendly match
 Korea DPR, 6 June 2009, World Cup Qualifiers
 Bosnia, 12 August 2009, friendly match

International appearances and goals
World Cup 3 (0)
World Cup qualification 6 (0)
Asian Cup 3 (0)
Asian Cup qualification 4 (2)
Friendly 17 (4)

Honours

Club
Hazfi Cup:
Runner up:
2002–03 with Fajr Sepasi
2005–06 with Persepolis
2012–13 with Persepolis

International

AFC/OFC Cup Challenge:
Winner:
2003 with Iran

Individual
UAE League:
Foreigner Player of the year:
2007–08 with Al-Shaab

References

External links

Mehrzad Madanchi at TeamMelli.com
Mehrzad Madanchi's Al-Shaab goals at YouTube.com

Iranian footballers
Iran international footballers
Association football wingers
Persian Gulf Pro League players
Fajr Sepasi players
Persepolis F.C. players
Al-Shaab CSC players
Al-Nasr SC (Dubai) players
Al Ahli Club (Dubai) players
UAE Pro League players
Steel Azin F.C. players
2006 FIFA World Cup players
2007 AFC Asian Cup players
Iranian expatriate footballers
1985 births
Living people
People from Shiraz
Sportspeople from Fars province